San Lucas is a town and one of the 119 municipalities of Chiapas in southern Mexico.

As of 2010, the municipality had a total population of 6,734, up from 5,673 as of 2005. It covers an area of 154 km².

As of 2010, the town of San Lucas had a population of 4,716. Other than the town of San Lucas, the municipality had 13 localities, none of which had a population over 1,000.

References

Municipalities of Chiapas